Transmembrane protein 138 is a protein that in humans is encoded by the TMEM138 gene.

Clinical relevance 

Mutations in this gene have been shown to cause a ciliopathy indistinguishable to Joubert syndrome.

References

Further reading